Miss USA 1986 was the 35th Miss USA pageant, televised live on May 20 from Miami, Florida on CBS. The ceremonies were hosted by Bob Barker. At the conclusion of the final competition, Christy Fichtner of Texas was crowned Miss USA, becoming the second consecutive winner from Texas. Fichtner served the pageant for only nine months as the pageant was moved into the newly-established February schedule in 1987. Florida's hosting the pageant marked the 15th time has ever done in the Miss USA history.

First runner-up was Miss World America 1986 and the future Academy Award-winning actress, Halle Berry.

Results

Placements

Special awards

Final competition

 Winner
 First runner-up
 Second runner-up
 Third runner-up
 Fourth runner-up
(#) Rank in each round of competition

Historical significance 
 Texas wins competition for the third time and twice in a row. 
 Ohio earns the 1st runner-up position for the first time.
 Georgia earns the 2nd runner-up position for the first time and surpasses the previous highest placement in 1970.
 Mississippi earns the 3rd runner-up position for the first time and surpasses the previous highest placement in 1979.
 California earns the 4th runner-up position for the third time. The last time it placed this was in 1969.
 States that placed in semifinals the previous year were Illinois, Oklahoma and Texas.
 Texas placed for the twelfth consecutive year.
 Oklahoma placed for the fourth consecutive year. 
 Illinois placed for the third consecutive year. 
 North Carolina last placed in 1984.
 California, Georgia and South Carolina last placed in 1983.
 Ohio last placed in 1982.
 Mississippi last placed in 1979.
 Wyoming placed for the first time.
 Missouri and New Mexico break an ongoing streak of placements since 1984.

Delegates
The Miss USA 1986 delegates were:

 Alabama – Heather Howard
 Alaska – Kim Christopher-Taylor
 Arizona – Jodi Lee Armstrong
 Arkansas – Rhonda Blaylock
 California – Kelly Parsons - Age: 22
 Colorado – Cheryl Ann Rohleder
 Connecticut – Jennifer Benusis
 Delaware – Lynn Marie Taylor
 District of Columbia – Desiree Keating
 Florida – Kathy Rosenwinkel
 Georgia – Tami Tesh - Age: 21
 Hawaii – Toni Costa
 Idaho – Kelli Catron
 Illinois – Tricia Therese Bach - Age: 22
 Indiana – Diane Andrysiak
 Iowa – Holly Wilkins
 Kansas – Audra Ockerman
 Kentucky – Jackie Taylor
 Louisiana – Celia Brady
 Maine – Annie Lewis
 Maryland – Kelly Koehler
 Massachusetts – Sheila Patrick Benson
 Michigan – Lisa Bernardi
 Minnesota – Cynthia Jane Peterson
 Mississippi – Barbara Webster
 Missouri – Cindy Jane Williams - Age: 22
 Montana – Laurie Ryan
 Nebraska – Ellen Withrow
 Nevada – LeAnna Grant
 New Hampshire – Lynda Mary Poulin
 New Jersey – Lisa Summerour-Perry
 New Mexico – Heather Howell
 New York – Beth Laufer
 North Carolina – Rhonda Nobles - Age: 20
 North Dakota – Beth Ann Remmick
 Ohio – Halle Maria Berry - Age: 19
 Oklahoma – Teresa Lucas - Age: 23
 Oregon – Kimberly Ann Stubblefield
 Pennsylvania – Sherri Fitzpatrick
 Rhode Island – Donna Silva
 South Carolina – Maribeth Curry - Age: 20
 South Dakota – Lori Schumacher
 Tennessee – Karen Compton
 Texas – Christy Fichtner - Age: 23
 Utah – Stephanie Reber
 Vermont – Tracey Danielle Morton
 Virginia – Maureen Carney McDonnell
 Washington – Jacqueline McMahon
 West Virginia – Shonna Lyons
 Wisconsin – Bonnie Joan Bonnicksen
 Wyoming – Beth King - Age: 22

Judges
Michael Young
Dave Robinson
Mai Shanley, Miss USA 1984 from New Mexico
John Callahan†
Miriam Stevenson, Miss USA and Miss Universe 1954 from South Carolina
Christopher Hewett†
Carol Connors
John Bolger
Maria Remenyi, Miss USA 1966 from California
Wayman Tisdale†
Kimberly Tomes Dutton, Miss USA 1977 from Texas
René Enríquez†

See also
Miss Universe 1986
Miss Teen USA 1986

1986
May 1986 events in the United States
1986 beauty pageants
1986 in Florida
1986